Sanaa Koubaa (born 6 January 1985 in Langenfeld) is a German athlete competing in the 3000 metres steeplechase. She represented  her country at the 2016 Summer Olympics without qualifying for the final.

International competitions

Personal bests
Outdoor
1500 metres – 4:13.48 (Leuven 2016)
3000 metres – 9:20.65 (Bergisch Gladbach 2015)
5000 metres – 16:40.42 (Koblenz 2011)
3000 metres steeplechase – 9:35.15 (Rio de Janeiro 2016)

Indoor
1500 metres – 4:27.00 (Leverkusen 2012)
3000 metres – 9:30.87 (Leverkusen 2012)

References

Living people
1985 births
German people of Moroccan descent
German female steeplechase runners
Athletes (track and field) at the 2016 Summer Olympics
Olympic athletes of Germany
People from Mettmann (district)
Sportspeople from Düsseldorf (region)